The Roman Catholic Diocese of Oita is a suffragan Latin diocese in the Ecclesiastical province of the metropolitan Archbishopric of Nagasaki in southern Japan.

Its cathedral episcopal see is the Cathedral of St. Francis Xavier (Oita Church), in the city of Ōita.

Diocese of Funai 
The first Catholic jurisdiction of Otai's territory was established on 19 February 1588, during Portuguese colonial prominence and missionary efforts in the Far East, as the Diocese of Funai (or Funay), on territory split off from the colonial Roman Catholic Diocese of Macau.

It was suppressed around 1660, having had the following incumbents (all Portuguese missionary members of Latin Congregations):
 Sebastião de Morais de Funchal, Jesuits (S.J.) (1588.02.19 – death 1588.08.19)
 Pedro Martins, S.J. (1592.02.17 –death  1598.02.18)
 Luis Cerqueira, S.J. (1598.02.18 – death 1614.02.15), succeeding as former Coadjutor Bishop of Funai 府内 (1593.01.29 – 1598.02.18) &  Titular Bishop of Tiberias (1593.01.29 – 1598.02.18)
 Diogo Correia Valente (華), S.J. (1618.01.08 – death 1633.10.28), also Apostolic Administrator of mother diocese Macau 澳門 (Macau, Portuguese China) (1626.08.27 – 1633.10.28)
 Apostolic Administrator (1638.02.26 – 1653) Francesco Antonio Frascella, Conventual Franciscans (O.F.M. Conv.), Titular Archbishop of Myra (1637.11.14 – 1653)

History 
 Established (restoring its above predecessor at a much lower level) on March 27, 1927 as Mission sui iuris of Miyazaki, on territory split off from the Diocese of Fukuoka
 January 28, 1935: Promoted as Apostolic Prefecture of Miyazaki
 December 22, 1961: Promoted and renamed after its see as Diocese of Oita

Ordinaries 
Ecclesiastical Superior of Miyazaki
 Fr. Vincenzo Cimatti (ヴィンチェンツォ・チマッチ), Salesians (S.D.B.) (1928 – 1935.01.28 see below)

Apostolic Prefects of Miyazaki
 Fr. Vincenzo Cimatti (ヴィンチェンツォ・チマッチ), S.D.B. (see above 1935.01.28 – 1940.11.21)
Apostolic Administrator (1940 – 1945.11.18) Francis Xavier Ichitaro Ideguchi (フランシスコ出口一太郎) while Apostolic Prefect of Kagoshima 鹿児島 (Japan) (1940.06.10 – 1955)
Apostolic Administrator (1945.11.18 – 1961.12.22) Dominic Senyemon Fukahori (ドミニコ深堀仙右衛門), while Bishop of Fukuoka 福岡 (Japan) (1944.03.09 – 1969.11.15), emeritate as Titular Bishop of Crepedula (1969.11.15 – 1976.08.09)

Suffragan Bishops of Oita
 Peter Saburo Hirata, Sulpicians (P.S.S.) † (22 December 1961 - 15 November 1969 ), later Bishop of Fukuoka 福岡 (Japan) (1969.11.15 – 1990.10.06)
 Peter Takaaki Hirayama (15 November 1969 - 10 May 2000)
 Dominic Ryoji Miyahara (10 May 2000 - 19 March 2008), later Bishop of Fukuoka 福岡 (Japan) (2008.03.19 – 2019.04.27)
 Paul Sueo Hamaguchi (26 June 2011 - 28 December 2020)
 Sulpizio Shinzo Moriyama (5 April 2022 - present)

See also
 Roman Catholicism in Japan

Sources 
 GCatholic.org with incumbent biography links
 Catholic Hierarchy

External links 
 http://www.cbcj.catholic.jp/jpn/diocese/oita.htm

Roman Catholic dioceses in Japan
Christian organizations established in 1927
Roman Catholic dioceses and prelatures established in the 20th century
1927 establishments in Japan